Amaan Ali Khan (born 1977) is an Indian classical musician who plays the sarod. Khan is the son of Ustad Amjad Ali Khan and often performs with his younger brother Ayaan Ali Khan, with whom he hosted the music talent show Sa Re Ga Ma.

Notes

n-[1]

Amaan and Ayaan Ali Khan dropped their family surname Bangash in 2006.

External links

1977 births
Living people
Hindustani instrumentalists
Indian television presenters
Indian people of Pashtun descent
Sarod players